The Minnesota Woman Suffrage Association (MWSA) was an organization devoted to women's suffrage in Minnesota. From 1881 to 1920, the organization struggled to secure women's right to vote. Its members organized marches, wrote petitions and letters, gathered signatures, gave speeches, and published pamphlets and broadsheets to force the Minnesota Legislature to recognize their right to vote. Due to their efforts, the legislature approved the Nineteenth Amendment in 1919.

History

Origins

In the 1870s, many women across Minnesota organized local women's suffrage groups. In 1875, the Minnesota legislature recognized women's right to vote in school board elections. However, many women wanted to vote in all elections. Seeing the need for a statewide agency, fourteen women formed the MWSA in Hastings in 1881. The Minnesota chapter was affiliated with the National American Woman Suffrage Association (NAWSA). Among the founders of the MWSA were Harriet Bishop and Sarah Burger Stearns. Stearns became the organization's first president. By 1882, the MWSA had grown to two hundred members. In 1885, MWSA-president Martha Ripley convinced NAWSA to hold their annual meeting in Minnesota. This national event demonstrated the importance of the Minnesota chapter to the larger organization. It also drew the attention of Minnesota's male lawmakers.

In 1893, the MWSA convinced the Minnesota Senate to take up women's suffrage. President Julia Bullard Nelson worked with Ignatius Donnelly, a Populist state senator. The Populists regularly supported a women's suffrage plank. Nelson herself was a Populist school superintendent candidate in 1894. Nelson and Donnelly initially sought the vote for women in municipal elections. However, the Senate went further. Its members voted to remove the word "male" from the state's voting requirements. The bill passed thirty-two to nineteen. However, this change did not pass the House. That chamber did not have time to take it up before the legislative session ended. Even if it had passed the House, however, the voters of Minnesota would have had to approve it before it became law.

After the failure of the 1893 amendment, the movement continued. However, the MWSA was unable to build on its earlier success. The MWSA and its ally, the Political Equality Club, placed women's suffrage before the state legislature every session. Each time, the bill either died in committee or was defeated.

In the early 20th century
During the 1910s, the movement picked up momentum again. In 1914, Clara Ueland - who would later become the MWSA's president in 1915 - organized a parade through Minneapolis of over 2000 suffrage supporters. This event gave the movement renewed attention. During this period, the MWSA had to contend with a rival organization, a Minnesota branch of the National Woman's Party (NWP). The NWP was more radical than the MWSA. It was much more likely to take direct action, such as hunger strikes, than the MWSA. Despite these differences in opinion, the two organizations often worked together.

By 1919, 30,000 women across the state officially belonged to local suffrage associations. They joined the MWSA, the NWP, and other organizations. Their numbers and continued activities convinced lawmakers to act. In 1919, the Minnesota legislature recognized women's right to vote in presidential elections. The same year, the legislature ratified the Nineteenth Amendment. However, the amendment did not take effect until 1920, when it was ratified by two-thirds the required of the states.

Present Day
With their right to vote secured, the MWSA became the Minnesota League of Women Voters, selecting Clara Ueland as their first president. The League is still active in Minnesota politics today, publishing a voting guide to inform voters on candidate positions on issues affecting women.

A memorial to the achievements of the MWSA currently stands on the lawn of the Minnesota State Capitol and is known as the Minnesota Woman Suffrage Memorial.

Notes

References

Further reading
M508, The Minnesota Woman Suffrage Association Records; Manuscript Collection, Minnesota Historical Society, St. Paul
Hurd, Ethel Edgerton. Woman Suffrage in Minnesota: A Record of the Activities in its Behalf since 1847. Minneapolis: Inland Press, 1916.
Lief, Julia Wiech. "A Woman of Purpose: Julia B. Nelson." Minnesota History 47, no. 4 (Winter 1981): 302-314.
Stuhler, Barbara. "Organizing for the Vote: Leaders of Minnesota's Woman Suffrage Movement," Minnesota History 54, no. 3 (Fall 1995):290-303.
Ziebarth, Marilyn. "MHS Collections: Woman's Rights Movements." Minnesota History 42, no. 2 (Summer 1971): 225-230.

"Women to March in Silence for Suffrage". The Minneapolis Tribune, May 2, 1914. p. 1 and p. 8 - via Newspapers.com
"Paraders Place Equal Suffrage on a New Plane". The Minneapolis Tribune, May 3, 1914. p. 1 and p. 3 - via Newspapers.com

Organizations based in Minnesota
Organizations established in 1881
Women's suffrage advocacy groups in the United States
1881 establishments in Minnesota
League of Women Voters
History of women in Minnesota